Stefania Montorsi (born 12 April 1968) is an Italian director and actress. She appeared in more than ten films since 1988.

Early life and career
Born in Bari, in the Carbonara-Santa Rita district, she has always lived in Rome; after a theatrical training, she made her debut on television and later in cinema, where she starred, among other things, in Mille bolle blu, directed by Leone Pompucci, Bits and Pieces, directed by Antonello Grimaldi, and Other Men, directed by Claudio Bonivento.

The 1993 film by Daniele Luchetti, The Storm Is Coming, which marks the beginning of an artistic and sentimental partnership, becoming his wife. With Luchetti she acts in Little Teachers and in Ginger and Cinnamon. In 2000 she starred in the international production Nora, with Ewan McGregor and Susan Lynch.

Among his productions for the small screen, we remember the tv films The Ogre, directed by Lamberto Bava, and Cuore in gola, directed by Stefania Casini, both from 1988, the tv miniseries Classe di ferro (1989), directed by Bruno Corbucci, and the TV movie Moses, directed by Roger Young.

In October 2010 her first novel Amori fuoricorso was released for the publisher Sonzogno RCS.

Selected filmography

References

External links 

1968 births
Living people
People from Bari
Italian film actresses
Italian stage actresses
Italian television actresses